Cade Davis (born June 28, 1988) is an American professional basketball player who last played for Kuala Lumpur Dragons of the ASEAN Basketball League.

College career
Davis played college basketball at the University of Oklahoma, with the Oklahoma Sooners, where he was one of the team's leading scorers and rebounders. At Oklahoma, he was a teammate of Blake Griffin.

College

|-
| style="text-align:left;"| 2007–08
| style="text-align:left;"| Oklahoma
| 28 || 6 || 13.3 || .320 || .275 || .1000 || 1.5 || 0.4 || 0.3 || 0.1 || 3.7
|-
| style="text-align:left;"| 2008–09
| style="text-align:left;"| Oklahoma
| 35 || 1 || 14.6 || .383 || .345 || .656 || 1.7 || 0.9 || 0.4 || 0.1 || 4.7
|-
| style="text-align:left;"| 2009–10
| style="text-align:left;"| Oklahoma
| 31 || 27 || 31.8 || .392 || .347 || .778 || 3.9 || 1.0 || 1.5 || 0.3 || 9.9
|-
| style="text-align:left;"| 2010–11
| style="text-align:left;"| Oklahoma
| 31 || 31 || 34.9 || .447 || .358 || .728 || 5.0 || 1.8 || 1.0 || 0.5 || 14.2
|- class="sortbottom"
| style="text-align:left;"| Career
| style="text-align:left;"|
| 125 || 65 || 23.6 || .404 || .341 || .759 || 3.0 || 1.0 || 0.8 || 0.2 || 8.1

Professional career
In July 2011, Davis signed to play with MZT Skopje. As one of the team's leaders and starters, he helped the team to win the Macedonian League championship in 2012, 2013, and 2014.

In August 2014, he signed with the Greek League team AENK for the 2014–15 season.

On September 11, 2015, Davis signed with Kauhajoen Karhu for the 2015–16 season.

On July 26, 2016, Davis signed with Pallacanestro Chieti of the Serie A2 Basket.

On August 5, 2017, Davis signed with Keravnos of the Cypriot League.

Eurocup

|-
| style="text-align:left;"| 2013–14
| style="text-align:left;"| MZT Skopje
| 8 || 3 || 25.9 || .440 || .419 || .714 || 2.9 || 1.8 || 1.0 || 0.3 || 7.8 || 6.1
|- class="sortbottom"
| style="text-align:left;"| Career
| style="text-align:left;"|
| 8 || 3 || 25.9 || .440 || .419 || .714 || 2.9 || 1.8 || 1.0 || 0.3 || 7.8 || 6.1

References

External links
Eurocup profile
RealGM profile
Oklahoma bio

1988 births
Living people
ABA League players
American expatriate basketball people in Cyprus
American expatriate basketball people in Finland
American expatriate basketball people in Greece
American expatriate basketball people in Italy
American expatriate basketball people in Malaysia
American expatriate basketball people in North Macedonia
American men's basketball players
Basketball players from Oklahoma
Basketball players from Texas
Kauhajoen Karhu players
Keravnos B.C. players
KK MZT Skopje players
Nea Kifissia B.C. players
Oklahoma Sooners men's basketball players
People from Elk City, Oklahoma
Shooting guards
Small forwards
Sportspeople from Amarillo, Texas
Kuala Lumpur Dragons players
ASEAN Basketball League players